is a railway station in the town of Rifu, Miyagi Prefecture, Japan, operated by East Japan Railway Company (JR East).

Lines
Rikuzen-Hamada Station is served by the Senseki Line. It is located 20.3 rail kilometers from the terminus of the Senseki Line at Aoba-dōri Station.

Station layout
The station has one side platform serving a single bi-directional track. The station is unattended.

History
The line was nationalized on May 1, 1944 and was renamed to its present name on that date. The station was absorbed into the JR East network upon the privatization of JNR on April 1, 1987. The station was closed from March 11 to May 28, 2011 due to damage caused by the tsunami associated with the 2011 Tōhoku earthquake.

Surrounding area
 
Hamada Fishing Port
Mt. Sokan
The Tōhoku Main Line track runs parallel here, but the nearest station is in Matsushima.

See also
 List of Railway Stations in Japan

External links
  

Railway stations in Miyagi Prefecture
Senseki Line
Railway stations in Japan opened in 1927
Rifu, Miyagi
Stations of East Japan Railway Company